Iselin is an unincorporated community in  Young Township, Indiana County, Pennsylvania, United States.

Notable person

Paul Wass (1925-2020), Pennsylvania state legislator and businessman, was born in Iselin.

Notes

Unincorporated communities in Indiana County, Pennsylvania
Unincorporated communities in Pennsylvania